Tristan Thompson (born May 22, 1998), known as Diamond Cafe, is a recording artist from Victoria, British Columbia.  While critics cite his style as a "blend of synth-pop and R&B", Thompson describes his music as "bathing in a cloud of honey on a very foggy night". He has released two mid-length EPs, and one full length album.


History

Early life
Tristan Thompson was born in Victoria, British Columbia on May 22, 1998. Thompson's first musical venture was as a Michael Jackson impersonator at age 12, busking locally on Government St. in Victoria, BC. 
In 2012 at age 15, Thompson began to post musical covers online at YouTube.com, eventually resulting in contact from Ontario record label Chatter Records. Thompson and Chatter Records released one album together, though after developing as an independent artist throughout his teen years, Thompson and Chatter Records parted ways due to creative differences mainly pertaining to Thompson's growing desire for creative control as well as the developing maturity in his lyrics, leading to the origin of Diamond Cafe.

Career
Under his real name, Thompson released one album, "Here For You", with Chatter Records in 2014. The album yielded several successful tracks and received significant radio play in Canada, even finding mild popularity overseas. 
As the current Diamond Cafe, Thompson released his first EP, Breathe, in September 2017 to favorable reviews. 
Diamond Cafe has since released an additional self-titled EP, as well as a considerable library of singles. Playing shows often in the Pacific Northwest Area, Diamond Cafe's live band consists of Thompson, Jasper Miller (of Outback), Brennan Doyle (of Cartoon Lizard), Adam Stothart, Angelica Peddie (also known as Petal Supply), and Lily Margison.

Discography

Extended plays

Singles
"Nothing Looks The Same In The Light" (18 June 2018)
"The Way You Used To Love Me" (24 November 2018)
"Look Up 2 Love" (6 September 2019)
"On N On" (13 November 2019)
"What I Want The Most"  (19 March 2020)
"Good Enough"  (1 April 2020)
"Not Sorry" (18 November 2020)
"Whatever It May Be" (25 May 2021)
"Don't Regret (feat.  Chuck Inglish)" (27 August 2021)
"Only Us" (29 November 2021)

References

External links 
 Official Bandcamp Website
 Official Youtube

1998 births
21st-century Canadian male musicians
Living people
Musicians from Victoria, British Columbia
Synth-pop musicians